Akhunzada Muhammad Sadiq was Pakistani politician. He was member of the 12th National Assembly of Pakistan from NA-36 (Hangu-cum-Orakzai).

See also 

 List of members of the 12th National Assembly of Pakistan

References 

Pakistani MNAs 2002–2007
Date of birth unknown